Laura Tui Mariu  (born 2 December 1980) is a Canadian international rugby league player. She represented New Zealand at the 2000, 2003, 2008, 2013 and 2017 Women's Rugby League World Cups.

Mariu was chosen to captain the New Zealand Warriors' Women's team in the inaugural NRLW competition in 2018.

In the 2018 Queen's Birthday Honours, Mariu was appointed a Member of the New Zealand Order of Merit, for services to rugby league.

Mariu will represent Canada Ravens in the 2021 Rugby League World Cup. She is eligible through her Canadian mother.

References

1980 births
Living people
Members of the New Zealand Order of Merit
New Zealand people of Canadian descent
New Zealand female rugby league players
New Zealand national rugby league team captains
New Zealand Warriors (NRLW) players
New Zealand women's national rugby league team captains
New Zealand women's national rugby league team players
Rugby league locks